Fairview Village is an unincorporated community in Worcester Township in Montgomery County, Pennsylvania, United States. Fairview Village is located at the intersection of Pennsylvania Route 363 and Germantown Pike.

Education
Methacton School District serves the area. Methacton High School is in the area.

References

Unincorporated communities in Montgomery County, Pennsylvania
Unincorporated communities in Pennsylvania